The Luna Awards are awards given annually by the Film Academy of the Philippines (FAP) to recognize the outstanding achievements of the Filipino film industry. The first awards were presented in 1983 in Pasay. It is considered to be the Philippine counterpart of the Oscars. It used to be known as the FAP Awards until in 2005 when it got its current name. Since 2007, the Academy started holding simple awards ceremonies due to lack of government funding and reduction of its share from MMFF earnings. This also caused some delays for ceremony scheduling.

History
In 1981, the Executive Order 640-A was passed by then President Ferdinand Marcos. The order mandated that the Film Academy of the Philippines should recognize outstanding film achievements annually.

The first awards was presented on April 27, 1983, in Manila Film Center which gave awards to the best films of 1982. It was known as the Film Academy of the Philippines Awards, shortened as FAP Awards.

In 2005, FAP held a naming contest to give a unique name for the awards and Luna was chosen.

The awards for 2009 films (28th Luna Awards) were not given due to budget constraints. The academy still count it as part of the numbering pattern of the awards even though it was not held.

Statuette
In 2005, Luna was chosen as the new name for the awards from the 221 names submitted to the contest. Romeo Cando and Baltazar dela Cruz won the prize of ₱5000 for naming it.

The word "Luna" means moon in different languages. Luna is also the Roman goddess of moon. It is also can be reflected in the idiom "shoot for the moon" which means to aspire for the seemingly unreachable because winning a Luna Award is something difficult to achieve.

Indirectly, the choice of Luna is also a way to pay homage to Juan Luna. A painting which was made by Luna inspired production designer Angel "Ulay" Tantoco in making the design of this statuette in 1981.

Luna is a long-haired woman with a flowing dress which represents the muse of arts. She holds a wreath and stands on twelve circular steps that represent all of the guilds of the academy. She is made of aluminum cast and weighs four kilograms.

Voting process
For a film to eligible, it should be released and have a commercial run for at least three days from January 1 to December 31 of the previous year. The voting process of Luna Awards was formulated by the academy with the help of Asian Institute of Management (AIM). It was partially implemented in 2004 and fully implemented in 2005. It is done by a three-body system composed of the citers, nominators and voters. A citer can also be a voter but cannot be a nominator.

The citers indicate whether a work should be cited or not. The cited works move on the next round. Ten seats are allocated for each guild focused on the professions of:
Direction
Performance
Screenplay
Cinematography
Production Design
Editing
Musical Score
Sound
Another ten seats are allocated for a non-category guild, totaling to 90 seats.

In the second round, a nominator should be a previous nominee in any major film awards like Luna, FAMAS, Urian and Metro Manila Film Festival. Five seats are assigned for each profession, adding up to 40 seats. They would rank all cited works from best to worst, with the two to five highest scorers becoming the nominees. To become a nominee in Best Picture, a film should have three nominations and one of these nominations should be in Best Direction or Best Screenplay.

The nominees would then move on the last round where voters would cast their votes. Fifteen seats are designated per profession and another fifteen for a non-category guild, numbering to 135 seats. The winners would then be announced in the awards night.

Ceremonies

1980s

1990s

2000s

2010s

2020s

Categories
Best Picture
Best Direction
Best Actor
Best Actress
Best Supporting Actor
Best Supporting Actress
Best Screenplay
Best Cinematography
Best Production Design
Best Editing
Best Musical Score
Best Sound

Special awards
Golden Reel Award
Fernando Poe, Jr. Lifetime Achievement Award
Manuel de Leon Award for Exemplary Achievements
Lamberto Avellana Memorial Award

Hall of Fame
An individual is inducted to the Luna Awards Hall of Fame if he/she won at least five competitive awards. Years listed are based on when they garnered their fifth trophy. Their total number of awards are also listed.

Willy Cruz (1987): 13 awards
Romy Vitug (1988): 8 awards
Phillip Salvador (1994): 8 awards
Edgardo Vinarao (1991): 7 awards
Ricky Lee (1996): 7 awards
Augusto Salvador (1996): 7 awards
George Canseco (1996): 6 awards
Ramon Reyes (2000): 6 awards
Rolly Ruta (1989): 5 awards
Vic Macamay (1998): 5 awards
Joel Lamangan (2006): 5 awards

References

External links
FAP/Luna Awards at the Internet Movie Database
Official Website of the Film Academy of the Philippines

Luna Awards
Awards established in 1983
Philippine film awards
Award ceremonies in the Philippines